Quercus scytophylla  is a species of oak. It is native to western and central Mexico from Sonora and Chihuahua to Chiapas.

References

scytophylla
Plants described in 1854
Endemic oaks of Mexico
Flora of the Sierra Madre Occidental